The 23rd Legislative Assembly of Quebec was the Quebec, Canada the provincial legislature that existed from July 28, 1948, to July 16, 1952. The Union Nationale led by Maurice Duplessis was the governing party for the second consecutive mandate since 1944.

Seats per political party

 After the 1948 elections

Member list

This was the list of members of the Legislative Assembly of Quebec that were elected in the 1948 election:

Other elected MLAs

Other MLAs were elected in by-elections during the term

 Charles James Warwick Fox, Union Nationale, Brome, December 7, 1948 
 Albert Samson, Union Nationale, Lévis, February 16, 1949

Cabinet Ministers

 Prime Minister and Executive Council President: Maurice Duplessis
 Agriculture: Laurent Barrée
 Colonization: Joseph-Damase Begin
 Labour: Antonio Barrette
 Public Works: Roméo Lorrain
 Social Welfare and Youth: Paul Sauvé 
 Health: Albiny Paquette
 Lands and Forests: John Samuel Bourque
 Hunting and Coastal Fisheries: Camille-Eugène Pouliot  
 Mines: Jonathan Robinson (1948), Charles Daniel French (1948–1952)
 Hydraulic resources: John Samuel Bourque
 Roads: Antonio Talbot
 Municipal Affairs: Bona Dussault
 Industry and Commerce: Jean-Paul Beaulieu
 Attorney General: Maurice Duplessis
 Provincial Secretary: Omer Côté
 Solicitor General: Antoine Rivard (1950–1952)
 Treasurer: Onésime Gagnon (1948–1951)
 Finances: Onesime Gagnon (1951–1952)
 State Ministers: Antoine Rivard (1948–1950)

References
 1948 election results
 List of Historical Cabinet Ministers

23